The 2020 Copa Sudamericana Final was the final match which decided the winner of the 2020 Copa Sudamericana, the 19th edition of the Copa Sudamericana, South America's secondary international club football tournament organized by CONMEBOL.

The match was played on 23 January 2021 at the Estadio Mario Alberto Kempes in Córdoba, Argentina, between Argentine teams Lanús and Defensa y Justicia. It was held behind closed doors due to the COVID-19 pandemic in South America.

The final was originally scheduled to be played on 7 November 2020. However, as the tournament had been interrupted since March 2020 due to the COVID-19 pandemic, CONMEBOL announced on 10 July 2020 that it would be rescheduled to be played in late January 2021, with 23, 24 or 30 January being the possible dates. Eventually, on 9 November 2020, CONMEBOL determined that the final would be played on 23 January 2021.

Defensa y Justicia defeated Lanús by a 3–0 score to win their first Copa Sudamericana title. This victory also meant the first title in the history of the team. As champions, Defensa y Justicia earned the right to play against the winners of the 2020 Copa Libertadores in the 2021 Recopa Sudamericana. They also automatically qualified for the 2021 Copa Libertadores group stage.

Venue
Since 2019, the Copa Sudamericana final is played as a single match at a venue chosen in advance. CONMEBOL announced on 15 October 2019 that the following four venues were candidates for the 2020 final:

On 17 October 2019, CONMEBOL announced that Estadio Mario Alberto Kempes, Córdoba was chosen as the 2020 final venue.

Teams

Road to the final 
Note: In all scores below, the score of the finalist is given first.

Match

See also
2020 Copa Libertadores Final
2021 Recopa Sudamericana

Notes

References

External links
CONMEBOL Sudamericana 2020, CONMEBOL.com

2020
Final
January 2021 sports events in South America
International club association football competitions hosted by Argentina
Association football events postponed due to the COVID-19 pandemic
Club Atlético Lanús matches
Defensa y Justicia matches